Itabuna is a municipality in Bahia, Brazil. It is the 6th largest city in Bahia by population after Salvador, Feira de Santana, Camaçari, Vitória da Conquista, and Juazeiro. It had an estimated 214,123 residents in 2021.

Etymology

The name "Itabuna" derives from Tupiniquim itáabuna, meaning father of stone (itá, stone + abuna, father). This name refers to a rock the Tupiniquim thought reminded them of a father and was bigger than the other stones around.

History

The Portuguese arrived in the 16th century. The region was inhabited by the Tupiniquim, an indigenous group of the larger Tupi people. The Portuguese established the Captaincy of Ilhéus in the region, but it failed due to attacks by the nomadic Aimoré people, who emerged from the interior of Brazil in the 1550s. Settlement began when the region served as the main crossing point for drovers heading to Vitória da Conquista. In the region crossed by the Cachoeira river, Arraial de Tabocas emerged in 1857, in the middle of a forest that had not yet been explored at the time.
The name Tabocas, according to the tradition, is due to a huge jequitibá, whose felling had been disputed, being the 'pau da taboca', that is, the swidden that opened.
The region was populated by non-native Brazilians from 1867, mainly by migrants from Sergipe. Felix Severino de Oliveira, later known as Félix Severino do Amor Divino, and José Firmino Alves, his cousin, founded Fazenda Marimbeta, a farm, in the municipality. A street remains with the name in the Conceição of Itabuna. Itabuna was emancipated from Ilhéus in 1910.  In 1978, the city became the seat of the Roman Catholic Diocese of Itabuna.

Itabuna used to be very wealthy due to the amount of cacao farms around it. It was once the second largest exporter of cacao in Brazil. The cacao boom however was short lived due to a disease called witch's broom. The economy of itabuna is now weak compared to cities of similar size and location.

In December 2021, the town was flooded after two dams burst.

Economy

Itabuna is a regional center of commerce, industry and services, along with its neighbour Ilhéus. Its economic importance grew during the golden era of cocoa cultivation. Thanks to its fertile soil, the city became the second biggest producer of cocoa in Brazil, exporting to the United States and Europe. After the devastation of crops caused by the fungus Crinipellis perniciosa (which causes a disease known as witch's broom), which led to a profound crisis in its economy, the city began to search a diversification of its economical activities. Nowadays, Itabuna is one of the most important trade points located along BR-101 Highway in Bahia.

Sport
Itabuna EC is the local association football team.

Notable people
Jorge Amado, writer
André Silva Carvalho, footballer

References

Municipalities in Bahia